Dante Luciani (born September 1, 1985]) is a former professional Canadian football wide receiver. He was drafted by the Edmonton Eskimos in the fifth round of the 2008 CFL Draft. He played CIS football for the Wilfrid Laurier Golden Hawks.

Luciani's 17-yard catch near the end of the 2005 Vanier Cup on a third down and fifteen-yard gamble set up a come-from-behind 24 to 23 victory for the Golden Hawks.

He was signed to the Eskimos practice roster for the 2008 Edmonton Eskimos season and returned for the 2009 pre-season but was released on cut-down day before the regular season.

On September 18, 2009, he was signed to the Montreal Alouettes practice roster. He was released on September 22 and signed by the Winnipeg Blue Bombers on September 23 to their practice roster.

References

External links
 Alouettes bio
 

1985 births
Living people
People from Oakville, Ontario
Players of Canadian football from Ontario
Canadian football wide receivers
Wilfrid Laurier Golden Hawks football players
Edmonton Elks players
Montreal Alouettes players
Winnipeg Blue Bombers players